Gryllidea is an infraorder that includes crickets and similar insects in the order Orthoptera. There are two superfamilies, and more than 6,000 described species in Gryllidea.

Superfamilies and Families
The Orthoptera Species File lists the following families in the infraorder Gryllidea:

Grylloidea
 † Baissogryllidae Gorochov, 1985
 Gryllidae Laicharting, 1781 (sometimes called "true crickets")
 Mogoplistidae Brunner von Wattenwyl, 1873 (scaly crickets)
 Phalangopsidae Blanchard, 1845
 Protogryllidae Zeuner, 1937
 Trigonidiidae Saussure, 1874 
 Family unplaced
 Pteroplistinae
 genus †Bellosichnus Genise & Sánchez, 2017

Gryllotalpoidea
 Gryllotalpidae Leach, 1815 (mole crickets)
 Myrmecophilidae Saussure, 1874 (ant crickets)

References

Further reading

 
 

Ensifera